Milligan College (also known as, Milligan) is an unincorporated community and an area of Elizabethton, in Carter County, Tennessee. Milligan is home to Milligan University and Emmanuel Christian Seminary.  All of Milligan has been annexed by the city of Elizabethton.

Postal service
Milligan has its own post office and zip code, which is 37682.

The Post office is located at the corner of Bowers Boulevard and Neth Drive on the college campus.

Education
Milligan is home to Milligan University and Emmanuel Christian Seminary.

Happy Valley Elementary School, Happy Valley Middle School and Happy Valley High School are located just a few minutes from Milligan.

References

Johnson City metropolitan area, Tennessee
Neighborhoods in Tennessee
Unincorporated communities in Carter County, Tennessee
Elizabethton, Tennessee
Unincorporated communities in Tennessee